WPGA-LD (channel 50) is a low-power television station in Macon, Georgia, United States, affiliated with the news-formatted digital multicast network Scripps News. It is owned by Marquee Broadcasting alongside Perry-licensed MeTV affiliate WPGA-TV (channel 58). Both stations share studios on Forsyth Street in downtown Macon, while WPGA-LD's transmitter is located on GA 87/US 23/US 129 ALT (Golden Isles Highway), along the Twiggs–Bibb county line.

History
The station first signed on the air on April 13, 1998, as W52CL on channel 52; it originally operated as an owned-and-operated translator station of the Trinity Broadcasting Network. On July 14, 2004, the station changed its callsign to W50DA and moved to channel 50. In 2009, Register Communications (owner of then-ABC affiliate WPGA-TV) purchased the station from TBN for $6,000. In early September 2009, W50DA dropped TBN programming and announced that it would change its network affiliation to the Retro Television Network on October 12. The day after the switch, the station's callsign was changed to WPGA-LP.

WPGA-LP had a construction permit that was first issued to the station by the Federal Communications Commission (FCC) in 2006 to flash-cut its digital signal into operation, which would significantly increase its signal coverage; this permit expired in March 2009. In mid-August 2011, WPGA-LP changed its primary affiliation to This TV, which was previously carried on the second digital subchannel of WPGA-TV (which is now affiliated with MeTV).

In addition to This TV programming, WPGA-LP for a time once used to simulcast the WPGA-FM radio program Mix in the Morning, which also aired on WPGA-TV, sister radio station WPGA (980 AM) and WNEX (1400 AM), each weekday from 6:00 to 9:00 a.m.

On July 2, 2015, This TV moved back to WPGA-TV on DT3; subsequently, WPGA-LP went dark for an undetermined amount of time.

On July 14, 2021, WPGA-LP was licensed to begin digital operation, changing its call sign to WPGA-LD.

On October 26, 2021, after six years of silence, WPGA-LD returned to the air affiliating with the Atlanta-based 24 hour news network Newsy (now Scripps News).

Subchannels

References

External links

Scripps News affiliates
Story Television affiliates
PGA-LD
Television channels and stations established in 1998
Marquee Broadcasting
1998 establishments in Georgia (U.S. state)
Low-power television stations in the United States